The 2021 Lamar Cardinals football team represented Lamar University in the 2021 NCAA Division I FCS football season as a member of the Western Athletic Conference.  The Cardinals were led by second-year head coach Blane Morgan and played their home games at Provost Umphrey Stadium.  The game against North American University is not included in the Western Athletic Conference or AQ7 standings because it was classed as an exhibition game and was not countable due to NCAA policies.

The Western Athletic Conference and ASUN Conference announced the formation of the WAC-ASUN Challenge (AQ7) for the 2021 season on February 23, 2021.  The Challenge included the four fully qualified Division I (FCS) members of the WAC (Abilene Christian, Lamar, Sam Houston, and Stephen F. Austin) and Central Arkansas, Eastern Kentucky, and Jacksonville State of the ASUN Conference.  The winner of the challenge received an auto-bid to the NCAA Division I FCS football playoffs.

The Cardinals finished the season with a 1–9 overall record. They were 0–6 in AQ7 Challenge play finishing in seventh place.

TV and radio media

All Lamar games were broadcast on KLVI radio, also known as News Talk 560.  Per a 2021 Western Athletic Conference agreement with ESPN, all home games were televised on one of the ESPN outlets.

Previous season

The Cardinals finished the season with a 2–4 overall record.  They were 2–4 in Southland play finishing in a tie with McNeese for fifth place.

Preseason

Recruiting
Sources:

Preseason polls

WAC Poll
The Western Athletic Conference coaches released their preseason poll on July 27, 2021. The Cardinals were picked to finish fifth in the conference.  In addition, one Cardinal, Anthony Ruffin, was chosen to the Preseason All-WAC Defense Team.  

 Note: Dixie State is not included since they are not playing a full WAC schedule due to previous non-conference game contracts.  Dixie State players are eligible for individual rewards.

Preseason All–WAC Team

Defense

Anthony Ruffin – Defensive Back, SO

AQ7 Poll
The AQ7 coaches also released their preseason poll on July 27, 2021. The Cardinals were picked to finish seventh in the ASUN-WAC Challenge.

Coaching staff and roster

Schedule

Game summaries

North American

Statistics

at UTSA

Statistics

at Northern Colorado

Statistics

Abilene Christian

Statistics

at No. 1 Sam Houston 

Statistics

at Abilene Christian

Statistics

Central Arkansas

Statistics

at No. 25 Eastern Kentucky

Statistics

at Tarleton State

Statistics

Jacksonville State

Statistics

No. 22 Stephen F. Austin

Statistics

References

Lamar
Lamar Cardinals football seasons
Lamar Cardinals football